The A-class submarines were a class of three vessels of German design built by the Krupp Germania naval shipyard in Kiel, Germany from 1913 to 1914 and deployed by the Royal Norwegian Navy.

It was used for coastal protection and from 1916 as a training vessel in the Baltic Sea.

Fates
All three A-class submarines were lost in the first week following the German invasion of Norway, one in combat and the other two through scuttling.

 (2 March 1914 – 9 April 1940) attacked and severely damaged by the two German R boat minesweepers R-22 and R-23 off the Vallø peninsula near Tønsberg in the Oslofjord on 9 April 1940. Her crew was captured and she drifted ashore at Vallø, a total wreck.
  (1914 – 16 April 1940) scuttled by own crew in Verkbukta at Tønsberg on 16 April 1940
  (1914 – 16 April 1940) scuttled by own crew in Verkbukta at Tønsberg on 16 April 1940

Footnotes

Literature
 

Submarine classes